Dang District is the district of Lumbini Province located in the Inner Terai of midwestern Nepal. Deukhuri valley of the district is the capital of the province and is the second largest valley of Asia surrounded by Sivalik Hills and Mahabharata Range. The district headquarter Ghorahi is the seventh largest city and the largest sub-metropolitan city of Nepal. Tulsipur sub-metropolitan city, the second largest city of Dang, is a major transportation hub with an extensive road and air networks. The district covers an area of 2,955 km2 and has a population of 548,141 (2011 census).

Dang district has been archeologically studied extensively since the 20th century due to the discoveries of ancient fossils of apes and early humans. The district is considered the center of Sanskrit language in Nepal and is home to Nepal's second oldest university, Nepal Sanskrit University which is the only Sanskrit university of the country as well as Rapti Academy of Health Sciences (RAHS), the state-owned medical college of Lumbini Province with the Prime Minister of Nepal as the Chancellor. There are numerous temples and gumbas in Dang Deukhuri district with puranic legendary connections to Mahābhārata, Shaivism, Shaktism & Gorakhnath making it one of the richest cultural sites of the country.

History and prehistory

Prehistory 
Archeologists consider the Churiya range very ancient with the existence of Sivapithecus (syn:Ramapithecus), a link between man  and ape. The pre-historic study of Dang valley has been carried out by Tribhuvan University since 1966, including the geological study of the Valley by Robert M. West from the American Museum of Natural History and the Department of Mines of then His Majesty's Government of Nepal from 1976, as well as the paleolithic study of Dang by University of Erlangen-Nuremberg (Fredrich-Alexander-Universität) of Germany in 1984, among others. According to these concurrent researches, Dang valley was a lake approximately 2.5 to 1 million years ago.

During 1984–86, German researcher Gudrun Corvinus studied the miocene-pliocene stratigraphy and geology of Dang valley researching on the pleistocene holocene period of ancient human settlements. She studied the exposed section of the road being constructed between Koilabas and the Dang Valley running through Deukhuri. Hand axes and other artifacts dated to early Paleolithic (1.8 million to 100,000 years ago) have been found in alluvial deposits along the Babai River in Dang Valley. Archeologists classify these as Acheulean, i.e. 'second-generation' toolmaking that succeeds the very oldest Olduwan. 

There are more numerous less ancient archeological sites dating to the Upper Paleolithic/Late Pleistocene (about 50,000 to 10,000 years ago). These are also along the Babai, as well as in Deukhuri Valley (Rapti River) adjacent and south of Dang Valley. Archeologists classify these as Acheulean, i.e. 'second-generation' toolmaking that succeeds the very oldest Olduwan.

Tharus 
Since ancient times, Dang valley is considered to have been inhabited by the indigenous Tharu people, albeit the exact timing of origin is still a matter of archeological research  Researchers consider that the valley was a growing center of Tharu civilisation. In the current times, Tharu people comprise one of the prominent indigenous ethnic communities of Nepal, and the Tharus inhabiting Dang valley are called Dangaura Tharus who have been able to retain their highly rich unique traditional culture.

Medieval and Modern History 

Evidence show that when the Khasa Kingdom was in existence in western Nepal, Dang was virtually under their political domination. One of the document of Punya Malla mentions that the valley was awarded to Jayakar Pundit as a virta in 1336 AD. From 1350 AD onwards, Meghraj Singh Chauhan of Chauhan dynasty is recorded to have been the king of the region as per the records in the Yogi Ratna Nath's Chaughera monastery of Dang valley, the third-in-line of Yogi Gorakhnath.The temple held a strong spiritual importance over the rulers of the valley, even after the change of power to new dynasties as such the internal activities of the temple were almost entirely unaffected for hundreds of years. Nevills Gazetteer of Bahreich (1922:124) mentions that in 1485 AD, Dangdun was in the possession of Udat Singh. Evidence shows that the last independent king Nawal Singh Chauhan ruled from Chaughera of Dang until 1760 AD as the House of Tulsipur which ruled one of the largest Taluqs of Oudh, India, which then included the Dang and Deukhuri Valleys.The town shares its name with another Tulsipur in Dang Deukhuri District, Nepal (c.65k North); the two towns are linked historically by having the same ruler.

In 1760 AD, Gorkhali King Prithvi Narayan Shah annexed the valley into the expanding Gorkha Kingdom. Three years later, Dang (except Tulsipur lands south of the Siwalik Hills) was given as a dowry to the King of Salyan in 1763 AD for the marriage of King Prithvi Narayan Shah's daughter. Around 1808 AD, Dang valley was finally annexed into the Kingdom of Nepal when Salyan state merged with the Unified Nepal of Shah kings.

Since Dang was somewhat higher, hotter, better-drained and therefore less malarial than most Inner Terai valleys in Nepal, it was settled to some extent by Shah and Rana courtiers and other Nepalese.  Deukhuri was more of a Tharu enclave until DDT was introduced to control the disease-bearing Anopheles mosquito in the 1950s. Before the construction of Rapti Bridge, Koilabas of Dang Valley was a major trading post with India which was slowly abandoned later. Koilabas has remnants of Persian Mughal Empire- style architecture visible in its ruins even now. Long time ago, Dang used to be the capital of Rapti Zone.

Administration 
The district consists of two sub-metropolitan cities and eight municipalities, out of which one is an urban municipality and seven are rural municipalities.The administrative regions are as follows:  
Ghorahi Sub-Metropolitan City
Tulsipur Sub-Metropolitan City
Lamahi Municipality
Gadhawa Rural Municipality
Rajpur Rural Municipality
 Shantinagar Rural Municipality
Rapti Rural Municipality
Banglachuli Rural Municipality
Dangisharan Rural Municipality
Babai Rural Municipality

Geography and Climate
This district consists of the larger easterly and upstream portions of the parallel Inner Terai valleys of Dang and Deukhuri, plus enclosing ranges of hills and mountains. Downstream, both valleys cross into Banke District.

To the south, the district borders Uttar Pradesh, a state in India, Nepal's neighboring country—specifically the Balarampur and Shravasti districts of Awadh. Because the international border follows the southern edge of the outermost Siwalik foothills called the Dudhwa Range, there is no Outer Terai extending onto the main Ganges Plain inside this district. The permeable geology of the Siwaliks does not support moisture retention or soil development, so they are covered with unproductive scrub forest.

The Dudhwas rise steeply to a crest at about 700 meters, then slope more gradually into the Deukhuri Valley, down to 250 meters elevation at the Rapti River. The Dudhwas extend more than 100 km, causing the Rapti to detour west around them before turning southeast down the main trend of the plains into India. Deukhuri's climate is nearly tropical and it is well watered by the river, as well as possessing abundant groundwater. North of Deukhuri Valley, the Dang Range rises as high as 1,000 meters with passes at about 700 meters.  The Dang Valley lies north of these hills, drained by the Babai River tributary to the Ghaghara (Karnali).  Valley elevations range from 600 meters along the Babai with alluvial slopes gradually rising northward to 700 meters along the base of the Mahabharat Range.  The district then extends upslope to the crest of the Mahabharats at 1,500 to 1,700 meters elevation. The bordering districts to the north are Pyuthan, Rolpa, and Salyan. The Rapti River of Western Nepal traverses through most of the lower Dang valley. It flows beneath the Churia range first on the northern side of the hills and then leaves the hills on the southern side. Nepal's second-longest bridge over Rapti river in Dang district connects Sisahaniya of Rapti Rural Municipality with Mahadeva of Gadawa Rural Municipality in the district.

Demographics
The dry and agriculturally unproductive Dudhwa range creates a buffer zone between the divergent cultures of the plains of Uttar Pradesh and the Inner Terai. Deukhuri was severely malarial before the late 1950s when DDT came into use to suppress mosquitos so that Tharu people who had evolved resistance managed to live in isolation from other cultures of the plains to the south and the hills to the north. Although road development further reduced Deukhuri's isolation by the 1980s, the valley retains some of its Garden of Eden charm with its lazy river, thick jungle alternating with rice paddies, surrounding hills in the middle distance and unique peoples.

Dang Valley is higher, less tropical, drier and less malarial than Deukhuri. Despite poorer soil and more seasonal streamflow, its healthier climate made it more attractive to settlers from outside even before the introduction of DDT. Since the early 1990s activist groups have been attempting to eradicate the practice of child indentured servitude among the Tharu, many of whom sold young daughters to wealthy families in urban areas. This region has majority of people of the Tharu ethnicity. The steep, virtually uninhabited southern slopes of the Mahabharat Range are another cultural buffer zone between traditional Tharu lands and the culturally distinct Middle Hills where Nepali is the dominant language, the homeland of dangi Chhetris. The Kumal (potter) ethnic group is also semi-indigenous.
 
At the time of the 2011 Nepal census, Dang District had a population of 552,583. Of these, 66.6% spoke Nepali, 28.3% Tharu, 1.9% Awadhi, 0.9% Kham, 0.9% Magar, 0.5% Hindi, 0.4% Urdu, 0.1% Bhojpuri, 0.1% Maithili, 0.1% Newar and 0.1% other languages as their first language.

In terms of ethnicity/caste, 29.7% were Tharu, 24.8% Chhetri, 13.6% Magar, 10.3% Hill Brahmin, 6.4% Kami, 2.7% Damai/Dholi, 2.3% Sanyasi/Dasnami, 1.9% Sarki, 1.5% Kumal, 1.5% Yadav, 1.2% Thakuri, 0.9% Musalman, 0.8% Newar, 0.3% Badi, 0.3% other Dalit, 0.3% Gurung, 0.3% Halwai, 0.1% Bote, 0.1% Chamar/Harijan/Ram, 0.1% Gaine, 0.1% Kathabaniyan, 0.1% Majhi, 0.1% Tamang, 0.1% other Terai and 0.1% others.

In terms of religion, 96.5% were Hindu, 1.3% Christian, 1.2% Buddhist, 0.9% Muslim, 0.1% Prakriti and 0.1% others.

In terms of literacy, 70.1% could read and write, 2.0% could only read and 27.8% could neither read nor write.

Population by Census 1971-2011

Education 

The district has become an emerging educational hub of Nepal in recent years with rise in number of schools, child development centers, resource centers and campuses. New initiatives taken by the rural municipalities and sub-metropolitan cities of the district have aimed at improving the quality of the education - most notably - making of the English language medium compulsory. Ghorahi Sub-Metropolitan City has also initiated to make the pre-primary level fully English medium. 

Nepal Sanskrit University (formerly Mahendra Sanskrit University)

Nepal Sanskrit University act was enacted by King Birendra in the advice and consent of Rastriya Panchayat in 1986 "to manage Sanskrit education in Nepal up to the highest mark and to study, research, protect and promote the special achievements received from Sanskrit education in various sectors as per the demand of time and to develop Nepal as a centre of knowledge and inspiration in Sanskrit education upon abiding by the traditional dharma, moral values, propriety and good behavior". As per this, Mahendra Sanskrit University (later renamed Nepal Sanskrit University) was established in Dang which at the time of its commencement was the second university of the country after Tribhuvan University.

Currently, the university offers Intermediate (Uttar Madhyama), Bachelor (Shastri), Bachelor of Education, Masters (Acharya) and Doctoral courses in classical and modern subjects. It offers intermediate in Ayurveda, Bachelors Of Ayurvedic Medicine And Surgery [BAMS] and condensed courses for Ayurvedacharya, as well as yoga training.

Rapti Academy of Health Sciences (RAHS)

Legislature-Parliament unanimously endorsed the ‘Rapti Health Science Academy Bill, 2074’ on 10 October 2017 as per the government's decision to open one state-owned  medical college in each province of Nepal. Currently, Rapti Academy of Health Sciences (RAHS) serves as the only state-owned medical college of Lumbini Province with the Prime Minister of Nepal as the Chancellor. In addition to normal medical procedures, the state hold entity is providing Intensive Care Units (ICU), Neonatal Intensive Care Units (NICU) as well as Pediatric Intensive Care Units (PICU).

Cultural Heritage 
Dang valley has a rich cultural heritage with a cultural combination of an older Tharu civilisation and mix of Hinduism. There are numerous temples and gumbas in Dang Deukhuri district with puranic legendary connections to Mahābhārata, Shaivism, Shaktism & Gorakhnath making it one of the richest cultural sites of the country.Major heritage sites in Dang Deukhuri District include:

Cultural Sites 
Ambikeshwari Temple is one of the spiritually important Hindu temple located in Dang district. The temple also known as ‘Maiko Than’ (Mother's Place) and is situated to the north of Ghorahi 3.5 kilometers away on bank of Katuwa Khola. The temple is also a Shaktipeetha, supposed to have emerged due to the falling of right ear of Satidevi according to the Swasthani Purana of Hinduism. This temple is the most popular Shaktipeeth of Dang valley.

Ratnanath (Gorakhnath) Mandir, Chaughera is in Chaughera of Ghorahi sub-metropolitan city. It is one of the major tourist and spiritual place of the Dang District. The temple is the namesake of Yogi Ratna Nath, third-in-line of Yogi Gorakhnath.

The temple held a strong spiritual importance over the rulers of the valley since older times, even after the change of power to new dynasties as such the internal activities of the temple were almost entirely unaffected for hundreds of years.

The legend of the origin of the monastery is tied to the rulers of the valley, as the narration tells us of a king who went hunting in the jungle where he saw a beautiful deer and shot an arrow. The wounded deer went deep into the forest, and the king followed it. Then suddenly, in the middle of the forest, he met a radiant ascetic, seated in a deep state of meditation with arrow in front of him. The king understood his mistake and apologized. The Siddha forgave him and granted him a boon through yogic power to reign over the Dang Valley. The yogi was Ratannath, the disciple of Yogi Gorakhnath and he took the arrow and gave it to the king, saying "as long as you keep the arrow, you will keep your kingdom firm." The king then started to worship Ratannath, and since then the king's lineage continued the worship and kept the arrow for six months. The other six months the Yogis worshipped the arrow and the king had to give them half of the revenue that he got from his kingdom" (summarized from Narharinath 2022: 516)

Dharapani Temple is situated in the Dharna municipality-01 of the district at the base of chure range, south of Babai river about 9 kilometer drive from the center of Ghorahi. The temple is believed to have been in the ancient site where the five Pandavas brother sat and chanted prayers to Shiva during their journey to Uttarapantha (Himalayas).

The temple has the world's largest Trishula and is one of the major tourist destination of the valley. In recent years, the temple has become an important visiting site for Hindu devotees as well as for prominent personalities such as the President of Nepal, police chiefs, chief justices and ministers.

Barhakune Daha (Baraha Chhetra), also known as Baraha Chhetra, is situated 3 km North from Ghorahi sub-metropolitan city. The region is dedicated to the Hindu God Vishnu and is widely worshipped during Makar Sankranti festival. The name comes from a pond around the temple which has twelve "bara" (in Nepali) corners.

Chameri cave is situated at the slopes of the Mahabharat range and is also known locally as "Siddha" cave thought to have been used by saints for penance in the valley. There has also been archeological interest in the cave due to the possibility of it being used by pre-historic humans. The cave is 4 storey tall with a spacious ground hall which can accommodate almost a thousand people in its space. Chameri cave holds archeological importance and various preliminary observations are being carried out or further research.

Other Prominent Sites 

Jakhera Lake  meaning "rain-water collection" is a lake located at Lamai Municipality-5 of Dang, about 35 kilometers far from Ghorahi and two temples dedicated to Ganesh and Siddeswor Mahadev around the lake. The lake is a major tourist attraction in the district and also provides spot for picnic and sight-seeing.

The lake lies in the base of Chure hills and is 6 feet deep with a span of 12 hectares.

Further prominent sites of the valley include: 
 Sawarikot
 Ghordaura
 Chhilli kot, Chhilli Kot Gupha, Chameri Gupha
 Devikot
 Hanuman Temple
 Kalimai Temple, Kalika Temple
 Kulpani Mandir
 Malika Temple, Mulkot Cave
 Ram Janaki Temple
 Sirasthan, Srigaun Temple, Sukaura Mound
 Bagar Baba mandir, Rihar
Taptakunda Shivalaya, Mamisauri mandir, Rihar
Shiva Mandir, Dhankhola
 Shiva Cave, Dhankhola
 Mata Malmala Devi, Malmala, Gadawa-1
 Tuhi valley
 Suikot Temple
 Devisthan Mandir [Pawannagar, Bhamake]
 Kalika mandir
 Jakhera Tal Temple

Transportation 

East West Highway —the main east–west highway across Nepal— follows Deukhuri Valley, passing Kalakate and Bhalubang bazar at the upper end and Lamahi downstream. From Bhalubang, branch roads lead up the Rapti River into Pyuthan and Rolpa Districts. From Lamahi there are roads north across the Dang Range to Ghorahi, and south over the Dudhwas to Koilabas, which used to be an international trade centre earlier. The East West highway which passes through the Lamahi joints the Banke district leading Kohalpur. Roads from Ghorahi lead to Rolpa district and the Swargadwari pilgrimage site. From Tulsipur a motorable road goes north into Salyan District. Nepal's second-longest bridge over Rapti river in Dang district connects Sisahaniya of Rapti Rural Municipality with Mahadeva of Gadawa Rural Municipality in the district.

At Tarigaun, Dang Airport (IATA: DNP, ICAO: VNDG) has daily scheduled connection to Kathmandu in Nepal.

Former Village Development Committees 
Prior to the restructuring of the district, Dang District consisted of the following municipalities and Village development committees:

 Amritpur
 Baghmare
 Bela
 Bijauri
 Chailahi
 Dhanauri
 Dharna
 Dhikpur
 Diruwa
 Gangapraspur
 Gobardiya
 Halwar
 Hansipur
 Hapur
 Hekuli
 Kabhre
 Koilabas
 Lalmitiya
 Laxmipur
 Loharpani
 Manpur
 Narayanpur
 Panchakule
 Pawan Nagar
 Phulbari
 Purandhara
 Rampur
 Saidha
 Satbariya
 Saudiyar
 Shreegaun
 Sisahaniya
 Sonpur
 Syuja
 Tarigaun
 Urahari

Maps
 Ministry of Federal Affairs and Local Development has downloadable district maps based on a detailed and comprehensive GIS database:
VDC boundaries
Land use
Rivers, streams, ponds
Motor roads and foot trails
 Besides the United Nations/Nepal map of districts and VDCs shown above, their Map Centre has a downloadable PDF version adding municipalities, roads and water detail.
 From 1992 to 2002 a definitive series of large scale topographic maps were surveyed and published through a joint project by Government of Nepal Survey Department and Finland's Ministry for Foreign Affairs contracting through the FinnMap consulting firm. Japan International Cooperation Agency substituted for FinnMap mainly in Lumbini Zone with one sheet showing the easternmost part of Dang-Deukhuri.

Topographic sheets at 1:25,000 scale covering 7.5 minutes latitude and longitude map the Terai and Middle Mountains including all of this district.  JPG scans can be downloaded here:

These sheets cover Dang Deukhuri District:

 2782 1B Amiliya (2005)
 2782 1D Sunpathari Naka (1997)
 2782 2A Rihar (1998)
 2782 2B Satbariya (1998)
 2782 2C, 6A Jangrahawa Mahatiniya (1998)
 2782 2D Bela (1998)
 2782 3A Atthaise (1998)
 2782 3B Hasipur (1998)
 2782 3C Lamahi (2005)
 2782 3D Lalmatiya (2005)
 2782 4A Bangesal (1997)
 2782 4C Bhaluban (1997)
 2782 6B Siriya Naka (1998)
 2782 7A Koilabas (2005)
 2782 7B Jawabairath (1999)
 2882 9D Shitalpati (1998)
 2882 13A Hamsapur (1998)
 2882 13B Panchakule (1998)
 2882 13C Bairiya Kusum (2005)
 2882 13D Hekuli (1998)
 2882 14A Tulsipur (1999)
 2882 14B Dubrin (1999)
 2882 14C Bijauri (1999)
 2882 14D Ghorahi (1998)
 2882 15A Holeri (1999)
 2882 15C Bach Pokhara (1998)
 2882 15D Swargadwari (1999)
 (JICA) 097-11 Shiwagadhi (1993)

References

External links

 
Districts of Nepal established during Rana regime or before